The Battle of al-Rai was a battle fought in August 2016 between the Free Syrian Army (FSA) and the Islamic State of Iraq and the Levant in the border town of al-Rai, part of the northern Aleppo Governorate on the border with Turkey, which resulted in the FSA capturing the town.

Background

On 8 April 2016, rebels from the Hawar Kilis Operations Room captured al-Rai and more than a dozen other villages, but withdrew after an ISIL counter-offensive 3 days later that recaptured almost all the villages they have lost. The rebels also briefly took over the town for a few hours in June before being driven out.

The battle
On 15 August 2016, after heavy artillery bombardment rebels began to storm the al-Rai grain silos and captured the silos along with several other positions. However, they were forced to withdraw the next morning after an ISIL counterattack from the north which recaptured all the points ISIL lost. Landmines played a role in slowing down the offensive.

On 17 August, FSA fighters launched a second assault after targeting IS positions with rocket artillery, breaking through the first lines of defense and re-entering the town. The FSA blew up 3 car bombs during the battle and fully captured al-Rai and its border crossing later that day, taking a number of surrendering ISIL militants as prisoners of war.

On the same day, the USAF operating as part of the CJTF-OIR conducted air support for the rebels during the battle by bombing several IS units near al-Rai. Fighting continued in the outskirts of the town as ISIL retained its headquarters in nearby Dudyan.

Due to the short time given to rebels to fortify the area, IS launched a rapid counter-offensive from the east on 19 August and recaptured the grain silos and nearby hilltops. However, the rebels repelled the attack on the town and claimed to have killed more than 10 IS fighters. FSA fighters also recaptured the grain silos the next day.

Aftermath

On 20 August, a large number of rebels and a military convoy containing more than 50 vehicles loaded with heavy and medium weapons from al-Rai were transferred to the Turkish border with Jarabulus, as the Turkish Armed Forces prepared for an attack on Jarabulus.

Between 27 and 28 August, the rebels claimed to had capture three villages east of al-Rai. However, it was reported that on 27 August, IS recaptured al-Rai. The next day, al-Rai was once again reported to be rebel-held. By 4 September, FSA captured all of the ISIL-controlled territory along the Turkish-Syrian border.

References

al-Rai
al-Rai
Aleppo Governorate in the Syrian civil war
Al-Bab District
al-Rai
al-Rai
al-Rai
August 2016 events in Syria
al-Rai